Geraldine O'Callaghan is a female kickboxer and World Muaythai Council title holder. O'Callaghan has fought 30 times and lost 10 times.

References

Living people
People from Ramsgate
English female kickboxers
Female Muay Thai practitioners
English expatriate sportspeople in Thailand
Year of birth missing (living people)